John Zacheus Goodrich (September 27, 1804 – April 19, 1885) was an American politician who served as a member of the United States House of Representatives and the 24th Lieutenant Governor of Massachusetts. He was born in Sheffield, Massachusetts on September 27, 1804. He attended the common schools and Lenox Academy.  He studied law, was admitted to the bar, and engaged in manufacturing; he graduated from Williams College in 1848.

Goodrich served in the Massachusetts State Senate, and was elected as a Whig to the Thirty-second and Thirty-third Congresses (March 4, 1851 – March 3, 1855).  He was a member of the 1861 Peace Conference held in Washington, D.C.. He was elected as a Republican Lieutenant Governor of Massachusetts in 1860 and served from January 1, 1861, until his resignation on March 29, 1861. He also served as the president of the Union Emigration Society, a group dedicated to organizing the North for political action.

Goodrich was appointed collector of customs at Boston on March 13 and served until March 11, 1865.  He retired from public life and died in Stockbridge, Massachusetts on April 19, 1885.  His interment was in Stockbridge Cemetery. He posthumously received one protest vote for Vice President at the 1972 Democratic National Convention.

References

Lieutenant Governors of Massachusetts
People from Stockbridge, Massachusetts
Williams College alumni
1804 births
1885 deaths
Whig Party members of the United States House of Representatives from Massachusetts
Collectors of the Port of Boston
19th-century American politicians
Massachusetts Republican Party chairs